No Smoking in Sarajevo is a 2016 French documentary film by Gianluca Loffredo and Andrea Postiglione. The documentary explores the history of rock band Zabranjeno Pušenje through stories of three founding members; Sejo Sexon, Nele Karajlić and Fudo. The film was released on October 26, 2016, in Paris, France.

On December 21, 2016, the film had its Sarajevo premiere at the 2016 Sarajevo Film Festival. The film won the Jury Award for Best Documentary Film at the 2017 Bosnian-Herzegovinian Film Festival in New York City, NY.

Synopsis 
The documentary tells the history of a  Yugoslavian rock band through stories of its three first members, Sejo Sexon, Nele Karajlić and Fudo. Their story is emblematic of what happened in socialist Yugoslavia in the last 30 years. The film revisits the time of New Primitivism, famous TV show Top Lista Nadrealista and old concerts of Zabranjeno Pušenje.

Cast 
 Davor Sučić, a.k.a. Sejo Sexon, guitarist and co-founder of Zabranjeno Pušenje
 Nenad Janković a.k.a. Nele Karajlić, vocalist and co-founder of Zabranjeno Pušenje
 Zenit Đozić a.k.a. Fudo, drummer and co-founder of Zabranjeno Pušenje

References

External links
 
 

2016 films
2010s Italian-language films
2016 documentary films
Documentary films about musical groups
Films set in Sarajevo
French documentary films
Italian documentary films
Zabranjeno pušenje
2010s French films